Maggie Collins is an Australian Brisbane-based band manager and national radio announcer. Collins is manager of Brisbane bands John Steel Singers and DZ Deathrays.

She broadcasts weekly for youth station Triple J where she presents the weekend afternoons show. She was the former music director at Brisbane radio station 4ZZZ.

She plays in the avant-garde pop band The Thin Kids.

References

Year of birth missing (living people)
Living people
Australian women radio presenters
Triple J announcers
Talent managers